An indirect presidential election was held in South Africa on 22 May 2019 following the general election on 8 May 2019. Cyril Ramaphosa of African National Congress, which held a majority in parliament, was the only candidate nominated and was elected unopposed.

References 

South Africa
2019
May 2019 events in South Africa